Christopher Orr is an artist.

In 2005 Orr, along with Stephen Farthing, co-ordinated the Royal Academy Summer Exhibition at the Royal Academy of Arts, London.

His work was included in the Tate Triennial in 2006.

References

 Christopher Orr at the Tate Triennial, 2006 
Review from The Times (London), Feb 28, 2006

Date of birth missing (living people)
Living people
20th-century British painters
British male painters
21st-century British painters
Year of birth missing (living people)
20th-century British male artists
21st-century British male artists